Dusky palm squirrel is a common name applied to two rodents that were formerly considered to be a single species.

Funambulus obscurus, native to Sri Lanka
Funambulus sublineatus, or the Nilgiri striped squirrel, native to India